The Ascend Amphitheater is an open-air event venue located on the Cumberland River in Nashville, Tennessee. It is set inside the Metro Riverfront Park. The amphitheater seats 2,300 in fixed seating, and 4,500 on the lawn, with a total capacity of 6,800.

History
Ascend Amphitheater was first proposed on August 27, 2013, when then-Nashville Mayor Karl Dean unveiled plans for the venue on the site of the city's former thermal transfer plant, which was phased out in the early 2000s. The site was originally proposed to be the home of First Tennessee Field, a minor league baseball stadium for the Nashville Sounds. After numerous financing delays, the ballpark project was scrapped in 2007 and the land sat largely vacant until construction on the amphitheater began. The land was occasionally used as temporary event space in the meantime.

Venue
Live Nation is the operator for the open-air venue. Eric Church opened the venue with two sold-out shows on July 30 and 31, 2015, followed August 1 by Chicago and Earth, Wind & Fire during their Heart and Soul Tour 2015, and Phish on August 4.

Live Nation signed a 10-year contract with Nashville and a 10-year contract with Ascend Federal Credit Union.

Concerts
A list of notable events held/to be held at the Amphitheater.

See also
 List of contemporary amphitheatres

References

External links
 Official website

Amphitheaters in the United States
Buildings and structures in Davidson County, Tennessee
Buildings and structures in Nashville, Tennessee
Music venues completed in 2015
Music venues in Tennessee
Theatres in Tennessee
2015 establishments in Tennessee